Li Chil-Gun (born 5 September 1970) is a North Korean Olympic boxer. He represented his country in the featherweight division at the 1992 Summer Olympics. He lost his first bout against Eddy Suarez.

References

1970 births
Living people
North Korean male boxers
Olympic boxers of North Korea
Boxers at the 1992 Summer Olympics
Featherweight boxers